The 2001–02 Libyan Premier League was the 34th edition of the competition, since its inception in 1963. The league was made up of 16 teams, with the first round of matches being played on September 7, 2001, and the last round of matches being played on May 16, 2002.

Ittihad won the championship, on goal difference from Nasr, for their first league title since 1991 and their 9th overall.

Four teams were relegated this season, including two-time champions Mahalla, as the league was reduced from 16 teams to 14 teams. Sawa'ed managed to retain their top flight status by defeating Akhdar 7–3, while rivals Sweahly lost 1–5 to Ittihad, ensuring the Benghazi club stayed up on goal difference.

However, due to suspicions that the Sawa'ed – Akhdar game was thrown, the LFF decided to relegate Sawa'ed and keep Sweahly up.

League standings

Top scorers
 Al-Saadi Gaddafi (Ittihad) - 19 goals
 Abdulrazaaq Jlidi - 18 goals
 Ali al Milyaan - 15 goals

References
Libya - List of final tables (RSSSF)

Libyan Premier League seasons
1
Libyan Premier League